Ernest Henry Bayer (September 27, 1904 – January 13, 1997) was an American rower who competed in the 1928 Summer Olympics.

In 1928 he was part of the American boat, which won the silver medal in the coxless fours event.

External links
 profile

1904 births
1997 deaths
Rowers at the 1928 Summer Olympics
Olympic silver medalists for the United States in rowing
American male rowers
Medalists at the 1928 Summer Olympics